Stephen Brady (born 1959) is an Australian diplomat.

Stephen or Steve Brady may also refer to:

Stephen Brady (chess player) (born 1969), Irish chess player
Steve Brady (baseball) (1851–1917), American baseball player

See also
 Stephen Bradley (disambiguation)